William Hill was an Australian sports shooter. He competed in three events at the 1908 Summer Olympics.

References

Year of birth missing
Year of death missing
Australian male sport shooters
Olympic shooters of Australasia
Shooters at the 1908 Summer Olympics
Place of birth missing